WFIF (1500 AM) is a radio station broadcasting a religious format. Licensed to Milford, Connecticut, United States, it serves the Bridgeport area. The station is owned by K.W. Dolmar Broadcasting Co.

Translators

References

External links

 
 

Milford, Connecticut
Mass media in New Haven County, Connecticut
FIF
Radio stations established in 1965
1965 establishments in Connecticut
FIF